is the eighth studio album by Japanese rock band Radwimps and the soundtrack for the 2016 Japanese animated film Your Name, released on August 24, 2016, by EMI Records and Universal Music Japan. It debuted at #1 on Oricon's weekly album rankings on September 5, 2016, with 58,000 copies sold. It received an album certification of Double Platinum from the Recording Industry Association of Japan for sales of 500,000 in 2017. The album also charted on US Billboard. It peaked at #16 on Billboard Heatseekers Albums, #15 on Billboard Soundtracks Albums, and #2 on Billboard World Albums chart. The vocal tracks were re-recorded in English and became available digitally on January 27, 2017, with a CD release on March 10, 2017.

Background
According to vocalist Yojiro Noda, it took almost a year and a half to make the entire score for Your Name movie. Director Makoto Shinkai, who is also a fan of the band, approached Noda through producer Genki Kawamura as soon as the production of movie was confirmed. When recording the soundtrack, the band was not able to see the actual animation until it was all finished, so they wrote music based on the script and words of the director, which caused many compositions to be adjusted to fit the animation. "It was really difficult to arrange music to fit the animation by the second," said guitarist Akira Kuwahara. "The songwriting process was moving forward at the same time with the animation so it influenced each other. The music changed the story, the lines, and if the new scene was created, we changed the music. It was a creative process," added Noda.

Track listing

Charts

Certifications

Awards and nominations

See also
Your Name (novel), a novelization of the film

References

External links
 
 

2016 soundtrack albums
Animated film soundtracks
Radwimps albums
Anime soundtracks
Universal Music Japan albums
EMI Records soundtracks